Avtar Singh Kang is a Punjabi singer and Punjabi folk contributor.  He is also known as 'A.S.' Kang.

Career
Born to a Sikh family in Kultham village of Nawashehar district of Punjab now called SBS Nagar in Indian Punjab, Kang was educated in the Govt. School for 14 years and then moved to U.K. there he played Kabaddi for some time then recorded his first EP- Lut Ke Lehgai in 1978 in the UK which become a super hit. This was the start of a new Phenomena, Kang was the first UK solo Punjabi artist to release an album. He was also the first UK artist to become international and get a record contract with HMV India. He was also the first UK Punjabi artist to do a recording in India. This recording was of the Giddian Di Rani Album with music produced by K.S.Narula ( father of Jaspinder Narula). Gidhian di rani has gone on to become one of the biggest hit songs in the history of Punjabi music and made Kang a household name amongst Punjabi people. Kang also became the first Punjabi artist to tour North America and many other countries. He then went on to record many other hits songs including: Ashiq Tera, Lambharan Di Nau, Desi boliyan, Valeti Boliyan and Aish Karo.

Awards
In 2010 Kang was awarded "Lifetime Achievement" award the Brit Asia TV Music Awards.

Recordings
He recorded Gidhiyan di raniya  in HMV New Delhi with Mr. Narula.which was distributed and produced by HMV.

Discography

References

External links
 bio

Living people
People from Punjab, India
1969 births
Punjabi people
Indian male folk singers